William Parker V (born May 17, 1981) is a former professional gridiron football linebacker. He played college football at William & Mary, and played professionally for the Cleveland Browns, Carolina Panthers, New York Dragons and Montreal Alouettes. He was a defensive assistant coach for the Montreal Alouettes of the Canadian Football League (CFL) from 2017 to 2018, and currently serves as an analyst for the Tampa Bay Vipers of the XFL.

Early years
Parker attended Atlee High School where he was a letterman in football, basketball, and track. In football, he was an All-Metro selection.

College career
Parker attended The College of William & Mary, where he graduated with a degree in Sociology.

As a freshman, in 2000, he finished second on the team with eight passes defended. In 2001, he was finished second on the team with 15 passes defended, and recorded 33 tackles. In 2002, he led the conference in passes defended from the beginning of the season to the end. He returned interceptions for touchdowns in back-to-back games and tied the Atlantic 10 record for interception returns for a touchdown in a season. He finished in the nation's top 50 in interceptions per game with 0.45. In his senior season, he recorded 45 tackles, two interceptions and forced one fumble with one recovery.

Professional career

National Football League
In 2004, Parker attended mini camp with the Cleveland Browns. In 2005, he attended training camp with the Miami Dolphins, then signed to the Carolina Panthers practice squad for a portion of the regular season and the entire post-season. In 2006, he attended training camp with the Panthers, however he was later released.

Arena Football League
In 2005, Parker made his Arena Football League debut on February 6 against the Dallas Desperados and recorded his first interception and tackle. He finished as the runner-up in both Rookie and Defensive Player of the Year voting. He was named to the All-Rookie and All-Arena teams as a Defensive specialist. He tied the franchise interception record with 10 and finished second on the team in tackles with 90.5. He also recorded two two-interception games on February 11 at the Las Vegas Gladiators and May 15 at and the Tampa Bay Storm.

In 2007, Parker recorded 66.0 total tackles and four interceptions for 39 yards. He also recorded a league-high 28 pass break-ups. He was named Defensive Player of the Game for Weeks 9 and 12.

In 2008, Parker played in all 16 games and finished with 71 tackles, 20 passes defensed, one fumble recovery, and eight interceptions. On September 23, 2008, Parker along with new Dragons advisory board members Kerry Rhodes of the New York Jets and Danny Clark of the New York Giants, unveiled the new logo for the New York Dragons.

Canadian Football League
Parker signed with the Montreal Alouettes on May 25, 2009. In his first 6 seasons in the Canadian Football League Parker recorded 283 tackles (average of 47.2 tackles per season), 7 special teams tackles, 11 interceptions, and 2 fumble recoveries. Parker was an East division all-star in 2013. He was a member of both the 97th Grey Cup and 98th Grey Cup championship team with the Montreal Alouettes. Parker was set to become a free agent in February 2014, following the 2013 CFL season, however, he was re-signed by the Alouettes to a new 2-year contract.

Coaching career
Parker helped to coach the Hanover Hawks football team during the 2004 season. He was a defensive backs assistant coach for the Richmond Revolution of the Indoor Football League. He was also an assistant coach for the Richmond Raiders of the Southern Indoor Football League. He became a defensive assistant coach for the Montreal Alouettes in 2017.

In 2019, he was hired by the Tampa Bay Vipers of the XFL as an analyst.

See also
 List of Arena Football League and National Football League players

References

External links
 Montreal Alouettes bio
 New York Dragons bio

1981 births
Living people
People from Mechanicsville, Virginia
Players of American football from Virginia
American football defensive backs
Canadian football linebackers
American players of Canadian football
William & Mary Tribe football players
Carolina Panthers players
Cleveland Browns players
Miami Dolphins players
New York Dragons players
Montreal Alouettes players
African-American players of Canadian football
Indoor Football League coaches
High school football coaches in Virginia
Montreal Alouettes coaches
Tampa Bay Vipers coaches